Eleanor "Nell" Mary Hall Hopman, CBE (née Hall; 9 March 1909 – 10 January 1968) was one of the female tennis players that dominated Australian tennis from 1930 through the early 1960s. She was the first wife of Harry Hopman, the coach and captain of 22 Australian Davis Cup teams.

Early life

Hopman was born on 9 March 1909 at Coogee, Sydney and was the only daughter and second of three children of Charles Ernest Hall, clerk, and Mabel Gertrude, née Tipper. She was educated at Claremont College, Randwick and as a student she excelled at tennis and music. She obtaining her licentiate and teaching diploma at the Royal College of Music, London, and received a scholarship in 1928 but instead elected to pursue a tennis career.

Career

Hopman teamed with her husband to win four mixed-doubles titles at the Australian Championships (1930, 1936, 1937, and 1939). They were mixed-doubles finalists at Wimbledon in 1935, losing to Fred Perry and Dorothy Round Little in three sets.

Hopman was a singles finalist at the Australian Championships in 1939 and 1947. She partnered with Maureen Connolly to win the women's doubles title at the 1954 French Championships. She played in 58 Grand Slam singles events during her career, the last one a first-round loss at the 1966 French Championships when she was 57 years old. She played in 27 of the 28 singles events that were held at the Australian Championships from 1930 through 1962, including 25 consecutive events from 1933 through 1962. Her last Grand Slam event was the women's doubles tournament at the 1966 US Championships, where she and Mrs. Arklay Richards lost in the first round.

Hopman was instrumental in Tennis Australia's decision to invite the reigning Wimbledon champion, Louise Brough Clapp, and Doris Hart to play tournaments in Australia in the summer of 1949–1950. She also arranged for Connolly and the American junior title holder Julie Sampson Haywood to play in Australia in the summer of 1952–1953. The end result was Tennis Australia's decision to establish a committee to discuss ways and means of improving the "poor standards of Australian women's tennis". Other tennis writers supported Hopman's efforts, accusing Tennis Australia of a "parochial attitude to women players". In 1955, Tennis Australia finally sent a women's team abroad, under the management of Adrian Quist. In 1961, Hopman took another women's team abroad, consisting of Margaret Court, Lesley Turner Bowrey, and Mary Carter Reitano. The tour was a financial success, but Hopman was accused of overworking and underfeeding her players and forcing them to stay in inadequate hotels. As a result, Court refused to participate in the 1962 overseas tour led by Hopman.

Hopman was employed by the United States Lawn Tennis Association and the Southern California Tennis Association from 1952 through 1954 to be the travelling companion and chaperon of Connolly. In 1962, she persuaded the International Tennis Federation to begin sponsoring the Federation Cup, now known as the Fed Cup, an international team event for women similar to the Davis Cup for men.

She was awarded the CBE in July 1962.

Hopman became the first life member of "Tennis Victoria" in 1965 but the following year underwent unsuccessful surgery for a brain tumor and died in January 1968.

Grand Slam tournament finals

Singles: 2 (2 runner-ups)

Doubles: 4 (1 title, 3 runner-ups)

Mixed doubles: 6 (4 titles, 2 runner-ups)

Grand Slam singles performance timeline

R = tournament restricted to French nationals and held under German occupation.

1In 1946 and 1947, the French Championships were held after Wimbledon.

See also

 Performance timelines for all female tennis players who reached at least one Grand Slam final

References

External links

 Australian Dictionary of Biography entry about Hopman
 National Portrait Gallery – Eleanor Mary ('Nell') Hopman (nee Hall)

1909 births
1968 deaths
Australian Commanders of the Order of the British Empire
Australian Championships (tennis) champions
Australian female tennis players
French Championships (tennis) champions
Grand Slam (tennis) champions in mixed doubles
Grand Slam (tennis) champions in women's doubles
Sportswomen from New South Wales
Tennis players from Sydney